Kostarevo is a rural locality (a selo) and the administrative center of Kostarevskoye Rural Settlement, Kamyshinsky District, Volgograd Oblast, Russia. The population was 1,011 as of 2010. There are 12 streets.

Geography 
Kostarevo is located on the Volga Upland, on the Ilovlya River, 35 km west of Kamyshin (the district's administrative centre) by road. Petrunino is the nearest rural locality.

References 

Rural localities in Kamyshinsky District